Nils Rosén (22 May 1902 – 26 June 1951) was a Swedish football midfielder who played for Sweden in the 1934 FIFA World Cup. He also played for Helsingborgs IF.

References

External links

1902 births
1951 deaths
Swedish footballers
Sweden international footballers
Association football midfielders
Allsvenskan players
Helsingborgs IF players
1934 FIFA World Cup players
Sportspeople from Helsingborg